Sultan bin Saud Al Saud ( Sulṭan bin Suʿūd Āl Suʿūd; died 1975) was one of the children of King Saud of Saudi Arabia.

Biography
Prince Sultan was the 6th President of the Al-Nasr Club in Saudi Arabia and held that office for 6 years (1969–1975). One of his brothers, Prince Abdul Rahman bin Saud, was the godfather of Al Nasr. Two of his nephews, Faisal bin Abdul Rahman and Mamdouh bin Abdul Rahman, were also Al Nasr presidents. Prince Sultan had six sons.

References

1975 deaths
Sultan
Year of birth missing